Semisynthesis, or partial chemical synthesis, is a type of chemical synthesis that uses chemical compounds isolated from natural sources (such as microbial cell cultures or plant material) as the starting materials to produce novel compounds with distinct chemical and medicinal properties. The novel compounds generally have a high molecular weight or a complex molecular structure, more so than those produced by total synthesis from simple starting materials. Semisynthesis is a means of preparing many medicines more cheaply than by total synthesis since fewer chemical steps are necessary.

Overview

Drugs derived from natural sources are usually produced by isolation from the natural source or, as described here, by semisynthesis from such an isolated agent. From the viewpoint of chemical synthesis, living organisms are remarkable chemical factories that can easily produce structurally-complex chemical compounds by biosynthesis. In contrast, engineered chemical synthesis is necessarily simpler, with a lower chemical diversity in each reaction, than the incredibly-diverse biosynthesis pathways that are crucial to life.

As a result, certain functional groups are much easier to prepare by engineered synthesis than others, such as acetylation, in which certain biosynthetic pathways can generate groups and structures with minimal economic input that would be prohibitive via total synthesis.

Plants, animals, fungi, and bacteria are all used as sources for those tricky precursor molecules, including the use of bioreactors at the meeting point between engineered and biological chemical synthesis.

Semisynthesis, when it is used in drug discovery, aims to retain the sought-after medicinal activity while other molecule characteristics are altered, such as those that affect its adverse events or its oral bioavailability in a few chemical steps. In that regard, semisynthesis stands in contrast with the approach of total synthesis, whose aim is to arrive at a target molecule from low-molecular-weight, inexpensive starting materials, often petrochemicals or minerals. While there is no hard-and-fast division between total synthesis and semisynthesis, which rather differ in the degree of engineered synthesis that is used, many commodity precursor molecules with complex or fragile functional groups are much cheaper in practice to extract from an organism than to prepare from simple precursors only. Hence, methods of semisynthesis are applied when a needed precursor molecule is too structurally complex, too costly, or too difficult to produce by total synthesis.

Examples of practical application of the use of semisynthesis include in the groundbreaking historic case of the isolation of the antibiotic chlortetracycline and the semisyntheses of the further novel antibiotics tetracycline, doxycycline, and tigecycline.

Further examples of semisynthesis include the early commercial production of the anti-cancer agent paclitaxel from 10-deacetylbaccatin isolated from the needles of Taxus baccata (European yew), the preparation of LSD from ergotamine isolated from fungal cultures of ergot, and the semisynthesis of the antimalarial drug artemether from naturally-occurring artemisinin. As the field of synthetic chemistry advances, certain transformations become cheaper or easier, and the economics of a semisynthetic route may become less favorable.

See also
Chemurgy
Drug discovery
Drug development
Production of cephalopsporins from 7-ACA
Production of penicillins from 6-APA
Production of steroids from 16-DPA

References

Chemical synthesis
Medicinal chemistry